Andreas Aeschbach (born 25 April 1970) is a Swiss former cyclist. He competed in the men's point race at the 1992 Summer Olympics.

References

External links

1970 births
Living people
Swiss male cyclists
Olympic cyclists of Switzerland
Cyclists at the 1992 Summer Olympics
Place of birth missing (living people)